The American Educational Resources Association (AERA) is an education resources organization in the U.S. According to the group's website, it was founded in 1916, and is research focused. The group publishes, issues awards, and holds meetings. The group is located in Washington, DC. The group has a site on Common Core Standards

The group's publications have included Review of Education Research.

References

Further reading
Pregaming AERA Education Week (subscription required), March 26, 2014

Educational organizations based in the United States
Organizations based in Washington, D.C.